Jothe Jotheyali is a 2019 Indian Kannada language soap opera. The series aired on Zee Kannada from 9 September 2019 and digitally available on ZEE5. The series is an official remake of the Marathi television series Tula Pahate Re. It stars Aniruddha Jatkar and Megha Shetty.

Synopsis 
Aryavardhan, a middle-aged businessman, falls in love with Anu, a young middle-class girl. Their Relation starts with the foundation of trust, however they face a lot of challenges in their relationship due to his age difference. Initially Arya although he loves Anu, does not accept her love because of his age. But when he realizes he cannot live without her, he confesses to her thinking that she is sleeping but she was awake and hears his confession and is on cloud nine. Their story even though not confessed to each other face to face about their love is going on smoothly along with small rifts in between. And finally Aryavardhan decides to profess his love, and shares about his past life with -about his first marriage and his first wife being dead. Anu resents him at first for hiding it but is later convinced by his honesty. He further wants to share about his past life but Anu refuses to listen saying that past is past. Then he finally confesses to her face to face and proposes to her. Next they face the challenge of getting their families accept of their relationship. When finally everyone agrees, Anu refuses to marry him as her trust on him is a little bit shaken as he hid an important truth from her and blames him for not saying the truth before hand itself. She goes in search of his past and realizes what hardships he went through in his childhood and feels guilty about hurting him. She apologies to him. They re-unite and finally get happily married.

However post marriage there are different set of revelations Anu learns about Arya's past life, she is shocked and her trust is broken this time. Arya is unaware of it. His love for her is pure, true and very passionate. The past is 20 years ago, Subash Patil is shown as a poor orphan living with his roommate jhende in Bangalore. One day, as he is rushing to give an interview, he shares his Auto rickshaw with Rajanandini Vardhan, daughter of rich businessman Rajvardhan and Sharada devi who all live in Rajanandini Vilasa in Bangalore. As the tyre of Rajanandini's car gets punctured, Subash drops her to her destination only to realise that his interview is in the same company. Falling in love with her due to her richness, he fakes a fraud in his company and wins Rajanandini's trust. The two eventually confess their love for each other and get married. After their marriage, Subash begins to live in the Rajanandini Vilasa with Rajnandini for Rajvardhan's wish. However, Rajvardhan gets all the proofs against him and insults him over obtaining his business. In retaliation, Subash unknowingly ends up making him have the wrong medicine, resulting in Rajvardhan's death. He also changes Rajvardhan's post-mortem reports which makes Sharada devi think that she is responsible for Rajvardhan's death. Feeling guilty, she decides to reveal the truth to the police but Subash stops her, saying that she will have to go to jail if she does so. Days later, Rajanandini doubts Subash and fixes a microphone in his office-cabin. She catches Subash and jhende red-handed as their plan gets recorded in the microphone. Upon receiving this proof, Rajanandini threatens to hand over Subash and jhende to the police while Sharada devi still does not know the truth. Unknowingly she fell off the cliff and died

Cast

Main 
 Aniruddha Jatkar (2019-2022) as Aryavardhan alias Subash Patil, Rajanandini and Anu Husband, Business Tycoon 
 Harish Raj (2022 - Present) as Aryavardhan and Sanju Desai, Sanju died by committing suicide and his face transplanted through plastic surgery to Aryavardhan, who met with an accident and his face drastically damaged 
 Megha Shetty  as Anu Aryavardhan aka Anu a  21-year old simple and middle-class girl falls in love with Arya, Pushpa and Subbu's only daughter, Arya's Second wife and Reincarnation of Rajanandini.
Sonu Gowda as Rajanandini Aryavardhan, Aryavardhan first wife, Owner of Rajanandini fabrics, CEO of Vardhan group of companies, Lovely daughter of Rajvardhan and Sharada devi and Harsha Vardhan sister.

Recurring 
 BM Venkatesh as Keshav Jhende aka Jhende, Arya's friend and employee of Vardhan group
 Manasa Manohar as Meera Hegde, A hard working girl who wishes to marry Arya, Vice President of Vardhan group
 Devaiah Kalakanda as Harshavardhan aka Harsha, Arya's brother-in-law, Rajanandini 's younger brother,  Mansi's husband and Sharadha's son.
 Shilpa Iyer (2019-2021) / Nayana KM (2021 – present) as Mansi Harshavardhan, A rich and posh woman, Harsha's wife.
 Jai Jagadish as Rajvardhan Shardha Devi's husband, Rajanandhini and Harshavardhan's father, Aryavardhan's father-in-law.
 Vijayalakshmi Singh as Sharadha Devi, Rajvardhan's wife, Rajanandini and Harsha vardhan mother after Rajvardhan and Rajanandini demise  Mansi's and Aryavardhan mother in law.
 Padmaja Rao as Priyadarshini Desai / Bhavani Patil, Aryavardhan and Sanju's mother, Prabhu Desai's wife
 Srinivas Prabhu as Prabhu Desai, Priyadarshini's husband
 Apoorva Shri as Pushpa Sirimane, Anu's mother, Subbu's wife 
 Shivajirao Jadhav as Subramanya Sirimane aka Subbu, Anu's father,  Pushpa's husband
 Sundarashree as Jogthavva, the occultist who guides Anu and her family
 Pragathi Prabhu as Poorni, Pushpa's sister Anu's aunt
 Shwetha as Rajini, Ramya's mother Raghupathi's sister, Sampath's aunt
 Priyadarshini as Ramya, Anu's friend and neighbour Sampath's cousin 
 Sugreev Gowda (2019-2021) / Vilas Rao (2021 – present) as Sampath, Raghupathi's son, Anu's friend and Ramya's cousin
 Kiran Kumar as Raghupathi, Sampath's father, Rajini's brother, Ramya's Uncle
 Pruthvi Ambaar as Neel

Guest Appearances 
 Vijay Suriya as Vijay Suriya, Anuradha's son
 Sudharani as Anuradha, Mother of Vijay Suriya

Reception

Critics
The romantic title track of  Jothe Jotheyali song, gone viral on social media platforms. The song has reached 2 crore+ views on Zee Kannada YouTube channel. It had many of its promos trending  all over India on YouTube. It is the 1st serial viewed even by people not only outside Karnataka but also outside India. It broke the language barriers and became popular among people in other states and country too

Ratings
On its opening week it was in No. 1 position in overall Kannada series It created a sensation all over Kannada television industry, social media platforms with numerous fan pages. It now maintains a top 5 position in the ratings.

Adaptations

Awards 
 Aniruddha Jatkar got best actor award in Zee Kannada Zee Kutumba awards 2020
 Megha Shetty got best actress award (people's choice) in Zee Kannada Zee Kutumba awards 2020
 Aniruddh Jatkar and Megha Shetty got Best Jodi award (Critics) at Zee Kutumba Awards 2020
 Jothe Jotheyali Title Song was Awarded the best Title Song of the year at Zee Kutumba Awards 2020.

References

External links 
 Jothe Jotheyali at ZEE5

Kannada-language television shows
Zee Kannada original programming
2019 Indian television series debuts